Tascia is a genus of moths of the family Zygaenidae.

Species
Tascia finalis (Walker, 1854)
Tascia instructa (Walker, 1854)
Tascia rhabdophora Vári, 2002
Tascia virescens Butler, 1876

References
Tascia at AfroMoths

Procridinae
Zygaenidae genera